The 2013–14 Heineken Cup pool stage is the first stage of the 19th season of the Heineken Cup, Europe's top competition for rugby union clubs. It involves 24 teams competing for eight quarter-final berths, awarded to the winners of each of six pools plus the two top-ranked second-place teams.  The next three best runners-up will be parachuted into the Amlin Challenge Cup.

The pool stage will begin on 11 October 2013 and run through to 17–19 January 2014.  The quarter-finalists will then participate in a knockout tournament that ultimately ends with the final at the Millennium Stadium in Cardiff on Saturday 24 May 2014.

Seeding
The seeding system was the same as in the 2012–13 tournament. The 24 competing teams are ranked based on past Heineken Cup and European Challenge Cup performance, with each pool receiving one team from each quartile, or Tier. The requirement to have only one team per country in each pool, however, still applies (with the exception of the inclusion of the seventh French team, Racing Métro 92).

The brackets show each team's European Rugby Club Ranking at the end of the 2012–13 season.

Pool stage
The draw for the pool stage took place on 5 June 2013 at the Aviva Stadium in Dublin.  The dates and times of the first 4 rounds were announced on 20 July 2013.

Under rules of the competition organiser, European Rugby Cup, tiebreakers within each pool are as follows.
 Competition points earned in head-to-head matches
 Total tries scored in head-to-head matches
 Point differential in head-to-head matches

ERC has four additional tiebreakers, used if tied teams are in different pools, or if the above steps cannot break a tie between teams in the same pool:
 Tries scored in all pool matches
 Point differential in all pool matches
 Best disciplinary record (fewest players receiving red or yellow cards in all pool matches)
 Coin toss

All kickoff times are local to the match location.

Pool 1

Pool 2

Pool 3

Pool 4

Pool 5

Pool 6

See also
 2013–14 Heineken Cup

References

External links
Official ERC website

Pool Stage
Heineken Cup pool stages